Karl Julian Theobald (born 5 August 1969) is an English actor and comedian. He has played 'Landlord' in Plebs and Martin Dear in Channel 4 sitcom Green Wing.

Early life
Theobald was born in Great Yarmouth, to Wendy Theobald. He grew up in Lowestoft, for seventeen years, where he studied at The Denes High School and went to dance school at an early age. He graduated from the Drama Centre London in 1998, to work with Theatre de Complicite.

Career
Theobald is the one-time comedy partner of Russell Brand; they formed a double act during the 1990s called Theobald and Brand on Ice. This has been mentioned by Brand on his BBC radio show and in his autobiography, My Booky Wook. As well as appearing in Green Wing, Theobald has written comedy for the television programmes The Sketch Show and Smack the Pony. He also appeared in the radio sitcom The Exterminating Angels.

In 2008, Theobald joined the cast of ITV science fiction series Primeval as Oliver Leek. He appeared in the 2010 film Get Him to the Greek, alongside Brand, playing his assistant. In 2014, he starred in the independent British feature film Downhill, with Ned Dennehy, Jeremy Swift and Richard Lumsden, which is a comedy about four men attempting Alfred Wainwright's Coast to Coast Walk. The film is directed by James Rouse and the screenplay was written by Torben Betts.

Film and Television

Film

Television

Radio

Stage

Theatre

Stand Up

Other Media

Music Videos

Video Games

References

External links

whatsonstage.com, 20 questions for Karl Theobald
 Karl Theobald at British Comedy Guide

Alumni of the Drama Centre London
English male comedians
English male television actors
English male stage actors
English comedy writers
Alumni of the Royal Central School of Speech and Drama
1969 births
Living people
People from Lowestoft
People from Great Yarmouth
Actors from Norfolk